J.R. Wharton Eyerman (9 November 1906—7 December 1985) was an American photographer and photojournalist.

Early life 
Eyerman was born in his parents' Butte, Montana photography studio. In a  biographical vignette that Life often published on their photographers and writers on the title page, he explained, in verse, that the mysterious letters preceding his surname were not initials for any actual names;

He left Butte to study civil engineering at the University of Washington in Seattle.

Life magazine 
Eyerman was on staff for Life Magazine from 1942 to 1961. He covered World War II for Life on the European and Pacific fronts. He once said;   Among his most famous photographs is the oft-reproduced long-shot of movie audience members all wearing 3-D glasses while watching the premiere of Bwana Devil in Hollywood in November 1952.

Such visual repetition was a favourite device; another example is Eyerman's expansive aerial shot for Life of multiple moving vans simultaneously emptying furniture into newly built houses on a Lakeview suburban street that stretches to the horizon, while his picture of a receding crowd of engineers at their drafting tables in a vast office space was selected by curator Edward Steichen for the world-touring Museum of Modern Art exhibition The Family of Man that was seen by 9 million visitors.

Previously, at MoMA, Eyerman had contributed to Memorable Life Photographs, November 20 – December 12, 1951; and Korea - The Impact of War in Photographs, February 13 – April 22, 1951, in which 5 of his G.I. portraits were shown; and later his work appeared in Photographs from the Museum Collection, November 26, 1958 – January 18, 1959, also at the Museum of Modern Art.

He left Life in 1961 to work for Time, National Geographic, and several medical magazines.

Technical innovations 
After opening his own structural engineering firm in Seattle, he developed new tools to photograph in difficult situations. In his 1957 book, author Stanley Rayfield noted that;

Death 
Eyerman died of kidney failure and heart failure at his home in Santa Monica, California.

External links 
Link to all Life Magazine-hosted pictures of J.R. Eyerman
Photo of audience in 3-D Glasses

References 

1906 births
1985 deaths
Deaths from kidney failure
People from Butte, Montana
University of Washington College of Engineering alumni
American photojournalists
Life (magazine) photojournalists
Structural engineers
Journalists from Montana
20th-century American journalists
American male journalists